The BWF World Junior Championships (also known as the World Junior Badminton Championships) is a tournament organized by the Badminton World Federation (BWF) to crown the best junior badminton players (under-19) in the world. The championships is held annually and consists of two separate competitions: a mixed team championships (Suhandinata Cup) followed by an individual championships (Eye Level Cups).

Editions
The precursor of the championships was the Bimantara World Junior Invitational held in Indonesia from 1987 to 1991. In 1992, International Badminton Federation (former name of Badminton World Federation) started the first IBF World Championships in Jakarta, Indonesia. BWF later decided the championships will be held annually instead of biennially starting from the 2007 edition. 

The 2020 BWF World Junior Championships was a tournament that was to be the twenty-second edition of the BWF World Junior Championships. It would have been held in Auckland, New Zealand from 11 to 24 January 2021. Originally the event was to be held from 28 September to 11 October 2020 but had to be rescheduled due to COVID-19 pandemic in New Zealand. On 22 October, it was later cancelled and the 2024 edition to be held in New Zealand. Auckland was awarded the event in November 2018 during the announcement of 18 major badminton event hosts from 2019 to 2025.

The 2021 BWF World Junior Championships was going to be  the twenty-second edition of the BWF World Junior Championships. It was planned to be held in Chengdu, China but was cancelled in August 2021 owing to widespread outbreaks of the Delta variant of COVID-19. China was awarded the event in November 2018 during the announcement of 18 major badminton event hosts from 2019 to 2025. Chengdu was named in July 2020 as the bidding city and accepted as the host for the event.

Past champions

Individual

Mixed team
The mixed team event was introduced in 2000 and later was known as Suhandinata Cup since 2008. A new trophy with Balinese ornament designed by Yose Sulawu was introduced in 2009 edition.

All time medal table

Successful players and national teams

World Junior Champions who later became World Champions
List of players who have won BWF World Junior Championships and later won the BWF World Championships:

Successful players
Below is the list of the most successful players ever in the BWF World Junior Championships, with 3 or more gold medals.

BS: Boys' singles; GS: Girls' singles; BD: Boys' doubles; GD: Girls' doubles; XD: Mixed doubles; XT: Mixed team;

Successful national teams
Below is the gold medalists shown based by category and countries since the championships' inception in 1992, with China being the most successful in the World Junior Championships. They were the only country ever to achieve a shutout of the medals which they did in 2000.

BOLD means overall winner of that World Junior Championships

Men's singles

Women's singles

Men's doubles

Women's doubles

Mixed doubles

Mixed team

References

External links
BWF: World Junior Championships

 
Youth badminton
Badminton
Junior